Lesikar Ranch Airport  is a privately owned, public use airport located seven nautical miles (13 km) east of the central business district of Hallettsville, a city in Lavaca County, Texas, United States.

Facilities 
Lesikar Ranch Airport covers an area of 25 acres (10 ha) at an elevation of 275 feet (84 m) above mean sea level. It has one runway designated 16/34 with a turf surface measuring 2,800 by 125 feet (853 x 38 m).

References

External links 
  at Texas DOT Airport Directory
 Aerial image as of March 1995 from USGS The National Map via MSR Maps
 Aeronautical chart at SkyVector

Defunct airports in Texas
Airports in Texas
Transportation in Lavaca County, Texas